The California Inland Empire Council (CIEC) of the Boy Scouts of America serves the Inland Empire of California.  The service area comprises San Bernardino and Riverside Counties.  People interested in joining scouting can go to BeaScout.org. The CIEC is headquartered in Redlands California where it has office and a Scout Shop.

The CIEC  formed in 1973 through the merger of the Arrowhead Area (#048) and Riverside Area Councils (#045). In 1974 Grayback Council (#024) also merged into the new council.  In 2006, the council acquired the San Bernardino County portions of Old Baldy Council (#043). The council territory includes all of Riverside and San Bernardino Counties.

History
The Riverside Area Council (#045) was founded in 1919 as the Riverside Council. In 1927, the Hemet-San Jacinto Valley Council (#028) merged into the Riverside Area Council (#045). In 1944, the council changed its name to Riverside County and Redlands, then in 1945 it went back to Riverside County. The Grayback Council (#024) was founded in 1945 as the Redlands Area Council. It changed its name in 1952. The Arrowhead Area (#048) council was formed in 1922 as the San Bernardino Valley council. Prior to adopting the name Arrowhead Area in 1933, the council was known as the  San Bernardino District from 1923 to 1933.

Organization
Gray Arrow District- SRedlands and San Bernardino Area
High Desert District- Hesperia to Barstow
Mt. Rubidoux District - Greater Riverside, Hemet and San Jacinto
Sunrise District- Palm Springs, Rancho Mirage, Palm Desert and other desert communities.
Tahquitz District -Temecula, Menifee and Lake Elsinore
Temescal District-Corona, Norco and Chino Hills
Old Baldy District -Ontario, Montclair, Upland, and Rancho Cucamonga

Camps
Camp Emerson, in Idyllwild-Pine Cove, California. Council operated since 1919, largely on land donated to the former Riverside County Council by developer and humanitarian Lee Emerson. Camp Emerson has two major distinctions it is the longest continuously operated Scout Camp west of the Mississippi and has the highest climbing tower for a scout camp west of the Mississippi. Camp Emerson provides year-round program and camping to Scouts, their families and outside organizations.
Camp Helendade SOLD 2000 ( no longer owned by the council), near Running Springs, California. Council operated since 1960. It was partially burned in the California October 2007 fires. Camp Helendade was given to Arrowhead Area Council in 1960 by Helen and Dade Davis, replacing Camp Arataba, located in the Barton Flats area. Camp Arataba, part of the history of Arrowhead Area Council since the 1920s, was the victim of a lodge fire in 1960.  The loss inspired the Davises to donate the land for a camp to the Boy Scouts.  Camp Helendade was originally called Camp Running Springs, but Edward Saxton, the Scout Executive of Arrowhead Area Council at the time, wanted to name the new camp in a manner that honored the donors.  Hence the name Helendade was selected (Helen + Dade).

Order of the Arrow

The council is served by the Cahuilla Lodge #127. The website for Cahuilla Lodge is http://www.snakepower.org/ It currently has six  chapters. The Lodge  was formed January 1, 1973 from the merger of Tahquitz Lodge # 127 and Wisumahi Lodge # 478. In 1974, the Lodge welcomed A-tsa Lodge # 380 into the family to make the territory of the Lodge as we know it today. With the merger of the Old Baldy Council, Navajo Lodge #98 also was merged into the Cahuilla Lodge. The Lodge has received many awards, local and national, in its history, including the National Service Award (2001), the E. Urner Goodman Camping Award (most recently in 2006), and the Section W4B Spirit Award (17 times in 29 years; most recently in 2006 (tie)).

See also
Scouting in California

References

Ontario, California
Boy Scout councils in California